Nur-Adad ruled the ancient Near East city-state
of Larsa from 1801 BC to 1785 BC (short chronology). He was a contemporary of Sumu-la-El of Babylon.

See also

Chronology of the ancient Near East

Notes

External links

Amorite kings
19th-century BC Sumerian kings
18th-century BC Sumerian kings
18th-century BC deaths
Year of birth unknown
Kings of Larsa
18th-century BC people